Slavic-Eurasian Research Center (Japanese: ユーラシア研究センター Surabu yūrashia kenkyū sentā) is a scholarly institute at Hokkaido University, Sapporo, Hokkaido, Japan. This Center specializes in research on the post-Soviet and postcommunist states and their inhabitants across Eurasia.

History
The origins of the Slavic-Eurasian Research Center’s go back to the Cold War. A year after the end of the US occupation of Japan (28 April 1952), a decision was taken at Hokkaido University on 24 June 1953 to coordinate research and activities of scholars who did research within the broad remit of Soviet and Communist studies or Area studies. Two years later, on 1 June 1955, the group was formalized as a Slavic Institute, incorporated in the University’s Faculty of Law. On 1 April 1978 this Institute gained organizational independence and was renamed as the Slavic Research Center (SRC).

In recognition of the geopolitical changes that followed the end of communism in Europe and the breakup of the Soviet Union (thus obviating the validity of Communist studies), on 1 April 2014, the Center was renamed as the Slavic-Eurasian Research Center (SRC).

Research divisions
At present research in the Slavic-Eurasian Research Center is conducted in the following divisions:
Russian Studies
Siberian and Far Eastern Studies
Central Eurasian Studies
East European Studies
Comparative Studies
Eurasian Unit for Border Research

Collaboration with foreign partners

In 2018 the SRC collaborated with 27 universities and research institutes from across Eurasia. Within the framework of the SRC's Foreign Visitors Fellowship Program, since 1978 tens of foreign scholars have been invited to do research at the Slavic-Eurasian Research Center, for instance, Norman Davies, Tsuyoshi Hasegawa, Tomasz Kamusella, Dariusz Kołodziejczyk, Stephen Kotkin, Vladislav Krasnov, Taras Kuzio, David Marples, Vojtech Mastny, Alexander Nekrich, Sabrina Ramet, Jadwiga Staniszkis, Jerzy Tomaszewski.

References

External links
 Japan's national center for Slavic and Eursian studies 

Cold War
Hokkaido University